Cedar Creek is an unincorporated community located in the town of Polk, Washington County, Wisconsin, United States.

History
Cedar Creek was originally called Maxonville, and under the latter name was founded in the 1840s by Densmore Maxon, and named for him. The present name is after nearby Cedar Creek.

Notes

Unincorporated communities in Washington County, Wisconsin
Unincorporated communities in Wisconsin